Valsøyfjord is a former municipality that was located in Møre og Romsdal county, Norway.  The  municipality existed from 1894 until 1965.  The municipality included the land surrounding the Valsøyfjorden and its entrance at the Arasvikfjorden in the present-day municipalities of Aure (in Møre og Romsdal county) and Heim (now in Trøndelag county).  It included a small part of island of Ertvågøya and the whole island of Valsøya as well on the mainland. The main church for the municipality, Valsøyfjord Church was located in the village of Valsøyfjord.  The administrative centre was the village of Engan.  Other villages in the municipality included Arasvika, Valsøybotnen, and Hjellnes.

History
The municipality of Valsøyfjord was established on 1 January 1894 when the larger Aure Municipality was divided into two municipalities:  Aure (population: 3,245) in the north and Valsøyfjord (population: 942) in the south.  During the 1960s, there were many municipal mergers across Norway due to the work of the Schei Committee.  On 1 January 1965, Valsøyfjord municipality was abolished and its land was divided between two neighboring municipalities.  The parts of Valsøyfjord on the island of Ertvågøya (population: 141) was merged with Aure Municipality and the rest of Valsøyfjord (population: 1,104) was merged with Halsa Municipality.

Government
All municipalities in Norway, including Valsøyfjord, are responsible for primary education (through 10th grade), outpatient health services, senior citizen services, unemployment and other social services, zoning, economic development, and municipal roads.  The municipality is governed by a municipal council of elected representatives, which in turn elects a mayor.

Municipal council
The municipal council  of Valsøyfjord was made up of 17 representatives that were elected to four year terms.  The party breakdown of the final municipal council was as follows:

Media gallery

See also
List of former municipalities of Norway

References

Aure, Norway
Former municipalities of Norway
1894 establishments in Norway
1965 disestablishments in Norway
Heim, Norway